Highland Township is one of thirteen townships in Franklin County, Indiana. As of the 2010 census, its population was 1,412.

History
Highland Township was established in 1821.

The Cedar Grove Bridge was listed on the National Register of Historic Places in 2014.

Geography

Cities and towns
 Cedar Grove

Unincorporated towns
 Highland Center
 Klemmes Corner
 Saint Peter
 South Gate
(This list is based on USGS data and may include former settlements.)

Adjacent townships
 Brookville Township (north)
 Whitewater Township (east)
 Kelso Township, Dearborn County (southeast)
 Logan Township, Dearborn County (southeast)
 Adams Township, Ripley County (southwest)
 Jackson Township, Dearborn County (southwest)
 Butler Township (west)

Major highways
 U.S. Route 52
 Indiana State Road 1

Cemeteries
The township contains one cemetery, South Gate.

References
Sources
 
 United States Census Bureau cartographic boundary files
Citations

External links
 Indiana Township Association
 United Township Association of Indiana

Townships in Franklin County, Indiana
Townships in Indiana